Pseudopithyella is a genus of fungi in the family Sarcoscyphaceae. There are two species in the genus, which have a widespread distribution. Pseudopithyella was circumscribed by Fred Jay Seaver in 1928.

References

External links

Pezizales genera
Sarcoscyphaceae